John Thurston (1777–1850) was an inventor who developed the use of slate beds and rubber cushions for billiard tables. He was dubbed "the father of the billiards trade."

In 1799, he founded a business to make billiard tables as well as general cabinet making. The company, Thurston & Co. Ltd, continues in business.

See also
Thurston's Hall

References

1777 births
1850 deaths
Cue sports inventors and innovators